Yau Oi Estate is a public housing estate in Tuen Mun, New Territories, Hong Kong near Light Rail Yau Oi stop. It was the third public housing estate built in Tuen Mun between 1979 and 1982 on reclaimed land of Castle Peak Bay. Consisting of 11 residential blocks, it was the largest single subsidized housing development in Hong Kong, with 9,153 units and a population of more than 35,000.

Houses

Education
Yau Oi Estate is in Primary One Admission (POA) School Net 71. Within the school net are multiple aided schools (operated independently but funded with government money); no government schools are in the school net.

See also
 Public housing in Hong Kong
 List of public housing estates in Hong Kong

References

Residential buildings completed in 1979
Residential buildings completed in 1980
Residential buildings completed in 1981
Residential buildings completed in 1982
Tuen Mun District
Public housing estates in Hong Kong
1979 establishments in Hong Kong
Housing estates with centralized LPG system in Hong Kong